Postplatyptilia naranja is a moth of the family Pterophoridae. It is known from Argentina.

The wingspan is 17–19 mm. Adults are on wing at the end of December and early in January.

References

naranja
Moths described in 1991